The 2018 Tour of Slovenia was the 25th edition of the Tour of Slovenia cycling stage race, held between 13 and 17 June. Race was organised as a 2.1 race on the UCI Europe Tour.

The race was decided on its queen stage (Stage 4) in the Kamnik–Savinja Alps with climbs to Seeberg Saddle (1218 m), Pavlič Pass (1338 m) and Volovljek Pass (1029 m). The stage was won by Primož Roglič with a 33-second lead over second-placed Matej Mohorič, with Rafał Majka in third.

Schedule

Participating teams
Twenty-two teams were initially announced for the 2018 edition; nine UCI WorldTeam and thirteen UCI Professional Continental and Continental teams

Stages

Stage 1
13 June 2018 — Lendava to Murska Sobota,

Stage 2
14 June 2018 — Maribor to Rogaška Slatina,

Stage 3
15 June 2018 — Slovenske Konjice to Celje,

Stage 4
16 June 2018 — Ljubljana to Kamnik,

Stage 5
17 June 2018 — Trebnje to Novo mesto,

Classification leadership table
In the 2018 Tour of Slovenia, four different jerseys were awarded. The general classification was calculated by adding each cyclist's finishing times on each stage, and allowing time bonuses for the first three finishers at intermediate sprints (three seconds to first, two seconds to second and one second to third) and at the finish of mass-start stages; these were awarded to the first three finishers on all stages: the stage winner won a ten-second bonus, with six and four seconds for the second and third riders respectively. The leader of the classification received a green jersey and the winner of the general classification was considered the winner of the race.

Additionally, there was a points classification, which awarded a red jersey. In the points classification, cyclists received points for finishing in the top 15 in a stage. For winning a stage, a rider earned 25 points, with 20 for second, 16 for third, 14 for fourth, 12 for fifth, 10 for sixth and a point fewer per place down to 1 point for 15th place. Points towards the classification could also be accrued – awarded on a 5–3–1 scale – at intermediate sprint points during each stage; these intermediate sprints also offered bonus seconds towards the general classification as noted above.

Mountains classification, the leadership of which was marked by a blue jersey.  In the mountains classification, points towards the classification were won by reaching the top of a climb before other cyclists. Each climb was categorised as either first, second, third or fourth-category, with more points available for the higher-categorised climbs. The fourth and final jersey represented the classification for young riders, marked by a white jersey. This was decided the same way as the general classification, but only riders born after 1 January 1996 were eligible to be ranked in the classification. There was also a classification for teams, in which the times of the best three cyclists per team on each stage were added together; the leading team at the end of the race was the team with the lowest total time.

Best young rider (under 23 years) by time was awarded with white jersey.

Best team, three best times of cyclists of the same team are taken into account.

Final standings

Team classification

References

External links

2018
2018 UCI Europe Tour